Tommy Clout (born 16 October 1993) is a New Zealand cricketer. He made his first-class debut for Otago in the 2018–19 Plunket Shield season on 21 February 2019. He made his List A debut on 26 January 2020, for Otago in the 2019–20 Ford Trophy.

Clout is also a barrister and solicitor of the High Court of New Zealand, having been admitted to the bar in 2017.

References

External links
 

1993 births
Living people
New Zealand cricketers
Otago cricketers
Place of birth missing (living people)